is a Japanese weightlifter. She competed at the 2012 Summer Olympics in the Women's 48 kg, finishing in 6th place.

References

1993 births
Living people
Olympic weightlifters of Japan
Weightlifters at the 2012 Summer Olympics
Japanese female weightlifters
20th-century Japanese women
21st-century Japanese women